Miami Township is one of the seventeen townships of Logan County, Ohio, United States. As of the 2010 census, the population was 2,349.

Geography
Located in the southwestern corner of the county, it borders the following townships:
Pleasant Township - north
Union Township - east
Harrison Township, Champaign County - southeast
Adams Township, Champaign County - south
Perry Township, Shelby County - west
Salem Township, Shelby County - northwest

Two villages are located in Miami Township: Quincy in the west and part of DeGraff in the northeast.

Name and history
Miami Township was organized in 1818. It is named after the Great Miami River, which flows through the township.  Statewide, other Miami Townships are found in Clermont, Greene, Hamilton, and Montgomery counties.

Government
The township is governed by a three-member board of trustees, who are elected in November of odd-numbered years to a four-year term beginning on the following January 1. Two are elected in the year after the presidential election and one is elected in the year before it. There is also an elected township fiscal officer, who serves a four-year term beginning on April 1 of the year after the election, which is held in November of the year before the presidential election. Vacancies in the fiscal officership or on the board of trustees are filled by the remaining trustees.

In the elections of November 2007, Philip Weeks and Thomas Weiskittle were elected without opposition to the positions of township trustee and township fiscal officer respectively.

Transportation
Important highways in Miami Township include State Routes 235, 508, and 706.

References

External links
County website
County and township map of Ohio
Detailed Logan County map

Townships in Logan County, Ohio
1814 establishments in Ohio
Populated places established in 1814
Townships in Ohio